Häcker is a surname. Notable people with the surname include:

 Birke Häcker (born 1977), German legal scholar
 Katharina Häcker (born 1986), German figure skater

See also
 Hacker (surname)

German-language surnames